Bellevue is an unincorporated community in New Castle County, Delaware, United States. Bellevue is located along U.S. Route 13, on the west bank of the Delaware River between Edgemoor and Claymont.

History
Bellvue was originally settled in the 19th century as Gregsville. It began as a quarry town.
Bellevue's population was 500 in 1890, and was 488 in 1900.

References 

Unincorporated communities in New Castle County, Delaware
Unincorporated communities in Delaware